Pierre-Hugues Herbert and Albano Olivetti were the defending champions but chose not to defend their title.

Seeds

Draw

References

External links
 Main draw

Challenger Biel/Bienne - Doubles